Derek Oliver nickname Del Boy, (born 1984), is a Scottish lawn and Indoor bowler.

Profile
He lives in Cockenzie and plays for the East Lothian Indoor Bowls Club and the Cockenzie & Port Seton Bowls Club.

Bowls career
In 2011, he won two medals at the European Bowls Championships in Portugal and three medals at the 2013 Championships in Spain. and the Scottish National Indoor Pairs. 

In 2016, he won the Scottish National Bowls Championships.

In 2018, he was selected as part of the Scottish team for the 2018 Commonwealth Games on the Gold Coast in Queensland where he claimed two gold medals in the Triples with Darren Burnett and Ronnie Duncan and the Fours with Alex Marshall, Duncan and Paul Foster. 

In 2019, he won the fours gold medal and triples silver medal at the Atlantic Bowls Championships and in 2020 he was selected for the 2020 World Outdoor Bowls Championship in Australia.

References

1984 births
Living people
Scottish male bowls players
Commonwealth Games gold medallists for Scotland
Commonwealth Games medallists in lawn bowls
Bowls players at the 2018 Commonwealth Games
Bowls European Champions
Medallists at the 2018 Commonwealth Games